George Whitaker is the name of:

 George Whitaker (educator) (1811–1882), Canadian clergyman and educator
 George Whitaker (sport shooter) (1864–1937), British sport shooter
 George Whitaker (Oregon educator) (1836–1917), American clergyman and university president
 George William Whitaker (1840–1916), painter from Providence, Rhode Island

See also
 George Whittaker (disambiguation)
 Whitaker (surname)